Eucalyptus tetrodonta, commonly known as Darwin stringybark or messmate, is a species of medium-sized to tall tree that is endemic to northern Australia. It has rough, stringy or fibrous bark on the trunk and branches, lance-shaped leaves arranged in opposite pairs, flowers buds in groups of three, whitish to cream-coloured flowers and cylindrical fruit.

Description
It has rough, fibrous or stringy, grey over reddish brown bark on the trunk and branches. Sometimes there are four ribs on the sides of the operculum. Flowering occurs between June and September and the flowers are whitish or cream-coloured.

Taxonomy and naming
Eucalyptus tetrodonta was first formally described by the botanist Ferdinand von Mueller in 1859 in Journal of the Proceedings of the Linnean Society, Botany.
The specific epithet is derived from the ancient Greek words meaning "four" and "a tooth", in reference to the four teeth sometimes found around the rim of the fruit. The closest relative of this tree is E. megasepala.

A paper published in the journal Australasian Plant Pathology, apparently spelt this species' name as Eucalyptus tetradonta.

Distribution and habitat
The Darwin stringybark is found on flats and plateaus in the Kimberley region of Western Australia region where it grows on flat areas and plateaus in sandy soils over laterite, sandstone or quartzite. The range extends eastward across the top end of the Northern Territory and parts of the Gulf of Carpentaria and Cape York regions in North Queensland. It is usually a part of open forest or woodland communities.

Conservation status
This eucalypt is classified as "not threatened" by the Western Australian Government Department of Parks and Wildlife, as "least concern" under the Northern Territory Government Territory Parks and Wildlife Conservation Act 2000 and as  "least concern" under the Queensland Government Nature Conservation Act 1992.

See also
List of Eucalyptus species

References

Eucalypts of Western Australia
Trees of Australia
tetrodonta
Myrtales of Australia
Taxa named by Ferdinand von Mueller
Plants described in 1859
Flora of the Northern Territory
Flora of Queensland